Stephen Penpel was the Dean of Wells between 1361 and 1379.

References

Deans of Wells